"So Many Nights" is the title track from The Cat Empire's 2007 album of the same name. It was the second single released from the album and was released as an EP on the iTunes Store. The second track from the EP is a cover, taken from the Paul Kelly album, Under the Sun.

"So Many Nights" was ranked number 50 in the Triple J Hottest 100 of 2007.

Track listing

References

External links
 

2007 singles
The Cat Empire songs
2007 songs
EMI Records singles
Virgin Records singles